Gabriele Zappa (born 22 December 1999) is an Italian professional footballer who plays as a right-back for  club Cagliari.

Club career

Early career 
Zappa began his youth career at Villasanta-based COSOV aged five, before playing one year for Nuova Usmate and then for Accademia Internazionale.

Inter Milan
Zappa was raised in the Inter Milan youth sector, and started playing for their under-19 squad in the 2016–17 season. On 10 April 2018, he signed his first professional contract with the club. He played several games for the senior squad in the summer 2018 pre-season, including appearances in the 2018 International Champions Cup.

On 30 January 2019, Inter agreed on his transfer to Pescara, with Pescara loaning him back to Inter for the remainder of the 2018–19 season, and Inter holding a buy-back clause. He was called-up for Inter's senior squad competitive game for the first time on 14 March 2019, for the Europa League game against Eintracht Frankfurt, but remained on the bench.

Pescara
Zappa joined Pescara on a previously agreed contract for the summer 2019 preseason. He made his professional Serie B debut for Pescara on 24 September 2019, in a game against Cittadella. He substituted Antonio Balzano late in the first half after Balzano suffered an injury. He made his first Serie B start the next game on 27 September 2019, against Crotone.

Cagliari
On 8 September 2020 he joined Serie A side Cagliari on loan from Pescara with an obligation to buy.

International career
In September 2016, Zappa was first called up to represent Italy in friendly games for the under-18 squad.

Style of play 
Zappa is an offensive right-back who can also play as a central defender on the right side. He is a good dribbler and offensive player.

Career statistics

References

External links

 

1999 births
Living people
Sportspeople from Monza
Footballers from Lombardy
Italian footballers
Association football fullbacks
Inter Milan players
Delfino Pescara 1936 players
Cagliari Calcio players
Serie B players
Serie A players
Italy under-21 international footballers
Italy youth international footballers